Slavko Šlander, nom de guerre Aleš (20 June 1909 – 24 August 1941), was a Slovene communist, Partisan, and people's hero. 

He was born in Dolenja Vas near Prebold, Duchy of Styria, Austria-Hungary (now part of Slovenia). Due to being executed by shooting in Maribor as a hostage during World War II in Yugoslavia, he was proclaimed a People's Hero of Yugoslavia on 25 October 1943. The 6th Slovene National Liberation Struggle Shock Brigade, established in 1943, and a neighborhood in Celje were named after him.

References

External links

1909 births
1941 deaths
Yugoslav Partisans members
Resistance members killed by Nazi Germany
Recipients of the Order of the People's Hero
Ethnic Slovene people
Slovenian people executed by Nazi Germany
Executed Slovenian people
People executed by Nazi Germany by firearm
People from the Municipality of Prebold
Executed communists